Clay Township is a township in Linn County, in the U.S. state of Missouri.

Clay Township was established in 1869, and most likely was named after Henry Clay, a Kentucky statesman.

References

Townships in Missouri
Townships in Linn County, Missouri